The 1899 Ohio State Buckeyes football team represented Ohio State University in the 1899 college football season. They played all their home games at Ohio Field and were coached by John B. Eckstorm. They were the first Buckeyes football team to go undefeated, finishing 9–0–1.

Schedule

References

Ohio State
Ohio State Buckeyes football seasons
College football undefeated seasons
Ohio State Buckeyes football